Pitu Guli (1865–1903) was an Aromanian revolutionary in Ottoman Macedonia, a local leader of what is commonly referred to as the Internal Macedonian Revolutionary Organization (IMRO). Nevertheless, Pitu Guli and his family were Bulgaromans.

Life

Born to a poor family in Kruševo, he demonstrated an independent and rebellious nature early in life. He left his home in Macedonia at the age of 17 in search of wealth in the Bulgarian capital, Sofia. In 1885, he returned to Macedonia, as part of a rebel squad of the revolutionary movement against the Ottoman Empire, led by Adam Kalmikov. He was captured and exiled to eastern Anatolia for a period of eight years, seven years of which were spent in the prison in Trabzon. In 1895, he again returned to Kruševo and became a member of IMARO. From this time on, he was fully committed to the autonomy of Macedonia from Turkish rule. Between 1897 and 1902 he was again in Sofia, where he also held an eating house. 

In March 1903, he began commanding a revolutionary squad, crossing the Bulgarian-Ottoman border heading for Kruševo. From April to August 1903, he trained and prepared his irregulars for the upcoming Ilinden Uprising. He died in Kruševo, defending the Kruševo Republic.

Family
Following the revolt, Romania, with the support of Austro-Hungary, succeeded in the acceptance of the Aromanians ("Vlachs") as a separate millet with the decree (irade) of May 10, 1905 by Sultan Abdul Hamid II, so the Ullah Millet ("Vlach Millet", referring to the Aromanians) could have their own churches and schools. Except for Bulgarian Exarchist Aromanians, as Guli's family, most members of other ethnicities dismissed the IMRO as pro-Bulgarian. Pitu is father of Tashko Gulev (Shula Guli), who died in 1913 as soldier of the Bulgarian Army in the battle of Bregalnica against the Serbs, during the Second Balkan War. He is also father of the revolutionary of the IMRO, Nikola Gulev (Lakia Guli), one of the people closest to Todor Alexandrov. He was arrested by the police of Kingdom of Serbs, Croats and Slovenes and died in custody after being tortured in 1924. Pitu Guli is a father of Steryo Gulev (Sterya Guli), who took part in the military units formed by former IMRO activists in Vardar Macedonia during the Bulgarian administration in World War II, to fight the communist Yugoslav Partisans. He reportedly shot himself after Bulgaria switched sides and withdrew from Yugoslavia in 1944, upon the arrival of Tito's partisans in Kruševo, in despair over what he saw as a second period of Serbian dominance in Macedonia.

Legacy
Pitu Guli is a national hero in North Macedonia and Bulgaria, and remembered as having fought heroically at Mečkin Kamen (Bear's Rock) near Kruševo, where he was killed during the Ilinden Uprising in defense of the Macedonian Kruševo Republic. A Macedonian Partisan Brigade was named after him. The Macedonian partisan Kuzman Josifovski took the alias "Pitu" after him. He is also celebrated in folk songs and poetry throughout the region of Macedonia, being mentioned in the national anthem of North Macedonia ("Denes nad Makedonija", "Today over Macedonia"). An Aromanian-language song about him, Cãnticlu al Pitu Guli ("The Song of Pitu Guli"), has also been composed.

Notes

References

1865 births
1903 deaths
People from Kruševo
Aromanian people
Aromanian revolutionaries
Members of the Internal Macedonian Revolutionary Organization
Bulgarian revolutionaries
Prisoners and detainees of the Ottoman Empire
Ottoman Kruševo
Aromanians from the Ottoman Empire